Kensington Town Hall may refer to:
Kensington Town Hall, London
Kensington Town Hall, Melbourne